Robert C Crombie was a male athlete who competed for England.

Athletics career
He competed for England in the long jump at the 1934 British Empire Games in London.

Crombie was the 1936 AAA champion.

References

English male long jumpers
Athletes (track and field) at the 1934 British Empire Games
Commonwealth Games competitors for England